2,5-Dimethoxy-4-iodoamphetamine (DOI) is a psychedelic drug and a substituted amphetamine.  Unlike many other substituted amphetamines, however, it is not primarily a stimulant. DOI has a stereocenter and R-(−)-DOI is the more active stereoisomer. In neuroscience research, [125I]-R-(−)-DOI is used as a radioligand and indicator of the presence of 5-HT2A serotonin receptors. DOI's effects have been compared to LSD, although there are differences that experienced users can distinguish.  Besides the longer duration, the trip tends to be more energetic than an LSD trip, with more body load and a different subjective visual experience. The after effects include residual stimulation and difficulty sleeping, which, depending on the dose, may persist for days. While rare, it is sometimes sold as a substitute for LSD, or even sold falsely as LSD, which may be dangerous because DOI does not have the same established safety profile as LSD.

Research
Research suggests that administration of (R)-DOI blocks pulmonary inflammation, mucus hyper-production, airway hyper-responsiveness and turns off key genes in in-lung immune response. These effects block the development of allergic asthma in a mouse model.

Several 5-HT2A agonist hallucinogens including (R)-2,5-dimethoxy-4-iodoamphetamine DOI, TCB-2, LSD and LA-SS-Az have unexpectedly also been found to act as potent inhibitors of TNF, with DOI being the most active, showing TNF inhibition in the picomolar range, an order of magnitude more potent than its action as a hallucinogen.

Pharmacology

DOI is a 5-HT2A, 5-HT2B and 5-HT2C receptor agonist.

DOI has been shown to be an extremely potent inhibitor of tumour necrosis factor-alpha inflammation at picomolar concentrations in cell studies.  TNF-alpha is an important target for research into degenerative conditions such as rheumatoid arthritis and Alzheimer's disease, where the disease process involves tissue damage through chronic inflammation. This could make DOI and other 5-HT2A agonists an entirely new area for development of novel treatments for these conditions.

DOI has also been shown to induce rapid growth and reorganization of dendritic spines and synaptic connections with other neurons, processes known to underlie neuroplasticity.

History
DOI was first synthesized by Alexander Shulgin. The radioactive iodine-125 form of DOI  for PET imaging was first developed in the lab of David E. Nichols.

In January 2007, British police reported that three young men had fallen ill, reportedly, after taking DOI at a rave in Biggleswade, near Milton Keynes, and warned others who had taken it to seek medical attention.  This would appear to be the first indication that DOI has found more widespread use as a recreational drug in the UK.

Legal status

Australia
The Standard for the Uniform Scheduling of Medicines and Poisons (SUSMP) of Australia does not list DOI as a prohibited substance.

Canada
Listed as a Schedule 1 as it is an analogue of amphetamine. The CDSA was updated as a result of the Safe Streets and Communities Act, changing amphetamines from Schedule 3 to Schedule 1.

Denmark
Illegal since 8 April 2007.

Sweden
Sveriges riksdag added DOI to schedule I ("substances, plant materials and fungi which normally do not have medical use") as narcotics in Sweden as of August 30, 2007,  published by Medical Products Agency in their regulation LVFS 2007:10 listed as DOI, 4-jod-2,5-dimetoxi-amfetamin.

United States
DOI is not scheduled in the United States, but it is likely that DOI would be considered an analog (of DOB), in which case, sales or possession could be prosecuted under the Federal Analogue Act. DOI is regularly used in animal and in vitro research. Scheduling DOI could cause problems for medical researchers.

US State of Florida
DOI is a Schedule I controlled substance in the state of Florida.

See also 
 2,5-Dimethoxy-4-Substituted Amphetamines
 DOF
 DOB
 DOC

References

External links 
 Erowid about DOI
 The Lycaeum about DOI
 PiHKAL entry
 DOI Entry in PiHKAL • info

Substituted amphetamines
Iodoarenes
2,5-Dimethoxyphenethylamines
Designer drugs
Serotonin receptor agonists
TNF inhibitors
PET radiotracers